Bothropoma mundum is a species of sea snail, a marine gastropod mollusk in the family Colloniidae.

Description

Distribution
This species occurs in the Red Sea and the Arabian Sea.

References

Colloniidae
Gastropods described in 1873